Conrado may refer to:

People with the given name
Gregorio Conrado Álvarez (1925–2016), Uruguayan general and former dictator
Luis Conrado Batlle or Luis Batlle Berres (1897–1964), Uruguayan political figure
Conrado Benitez (1889–1971), former dean of the University of the Philippines
Conrado Cabrera (born 1967), retired male track cyclist from Cuba
Conrado Conde (born 1911), Filipino film director and an actor
Conrado Dayrit (1919–2007), Filipino doctor and scientist known for his advocacy of coconut oil
Conrado del Campo (1878–1953), composer, violinist and professor at the Real Conservatorio de Música in Madrid
Evaristo Conrado Engelberg (1853–1932), Brazilian mechanical engineer and inventor
José Conrado Hernández (1849–1932), served as Chief Justice of the Supreme Court of Puerto Rico from 1909 to 1922
Conrado Marrero (1911–2014), Cuban professional baseball pitcher
Conrado San Martín (born 1921), Spanish actor with a long and prolific career
Conrado Miranda (born 1928), Salvadoran football player and former coach
Conrado Nalé Roxlo (1898–1971), Argentine writer, journalist and humorist
Conrado Pérez (born 1950), former basketball player from Cuba
Conrado Rolando (born 1903), Uruguayan fencer
Conrado M. Vasquez (1913–2006), the first Ombudsman of the Philippines and Associate Justice of the Supreme Court of the Philippines
Conrado Vega (1938–2010), American politician and educator
Conrado Villegas (1841–1884), Argentine general in the 1880s during the presidency of Julio Argentino Roca
Conrado Walter (1923–2018), German prelate of the Roman Catholic Church
Conrado (footballer, born 1991), Paulo Conrado do Carmo Sardin, Brazilian football forward
Conrado (footballer, born 1997), Conrado Buchanelli Holz, Brazilian football left-back

People with the surname
Alex Conrado (born 1969), Spanish soundtrack composer for cinema
Anderson Conrado (born 1978), Brazilian football (soccer) defender also known as Amaral
José Conrado, a Cuban priest in Santiago de Cuba known for his strongly worded open letter to Cuban President Raúl Castro

See also
São Conrado, an affluent neighborhood in the South Zone (Zona Sul) of the Brazilian city of Rio de Janeiro

Conrad (disambiguation)